Heddy Lester (born Heddy Affolter, 18 June 1950 – 29 January 2023) was a Dutch singer and actress, best known outside the Netherlands for her participation in the 1977 Eurovision Song Contest.

Early career 
Lester was born in Amsterdam. Her professional career started with Gert Balke as the duo April Shower, who had a minor hit with "Railroad Song" in 1971. Her father ran a restaurant in Amsterdam, where she met singer Ramses Shaffy, with whom she started touring.  Lester launched her solo career in 1974.

Eurovision Song Contest 
In 1977, Lester's song "De mallemolen" ("The Merry-Go-Round"), with music written by her brother Frank, was chosen by a celebrity panel as the winner in the Dutch Eurovision selection. Lester went forward to take part in the 22nd Eurovision Song Contest, held in London on 7 May.  Although "De mallemolen" had been considered a strong contender prior to the contest, it could only manage a disappointing 12th-place finish of 18 entries.

Later career 
After her Eurovision appearance, Lester worked in a variety of both musical and dramatic stage roles, including works by Lorca (Blood wedding), Euripides (The Trojan Women) and Joshua Sobol (Ghetto).

In 2009, Lester, along with several other former Dutch Eurovision contestants, was a special guest on that year's Eurovision selection television programme.

Personal life and death 
Lester died on 29 January 2023, at the age of 72, of bladder cancer.

Discography 

Singles

April Shower
 1971: "Mama Look Upon Me"
 1971: "Railroad Song" (#30)
 1972: "It's So Funny"
 1973: "Danny's Song"

Solo
 1974: "Friend of Mine"
 1977: "De mallemolen" (#28)
 1977: "Words Keep Turning"
 1978: "Samen"

Album
 1977: Deel van m'n bestaan

References

External links 
 1977 page at Dingadong.nl (Dutch)
 
 

1950 births
2023 deaths
20th-century Dutch actresses
Eurovision Song Contest entrants for the Netherlands
20th-century Dutch women singers
Eurovision Song Contest entrants of 1977
Musicians from Amsterdam
Ariola Records artists
Nationaal Songfestival contestants
Dutch stage actresses